Lindita may refer to:
 Lindita (given name)
 Lindita (singer)